Admiral Sir Noel Frank Laurence  (27 December 1882 – 26 January 1970) was a notable Royal Navy submarine commander during the First World War.

Early life
Laurence was born in 1882 in Kent, the son of Frederic Laurence, . He joined the Royal Navy in 1899. By 1904 he was a lieutenant and a submarine specialist.

Naval service
In 1914, he commanded the submarine , it operated in the Baltic Sea to attack the German High Seas Fleet. While in the Baltic Laurence worked with the Russians and in 1915 E1 stopped a naval attack on Riga when it sank a German transport and damaged the battlecruiser . As well as being awarded the Distinguished Service Order for his work in the Baltic the Russians awarded him the Order of St. George (4th Class) and the Order of St Vladimir (4th Class with swords).

Laurence's next command was the submarine  which torpedoed two German battleships near Jutland. He was awarded a bar to his Distinguished Service Order for his further operation in submarines in the 1917 New Year Honours, and was made a Chevalier of the Legion of Honour by the French.

Laurence became Commodore of Devonport Naval Barracks in 1930, Rear-Admiral Submarines in 1932 and Vice-Admiral Aircraft Carriers in 1936. He went on to be Admiral Commanding Reserves in 1938 before he moved to Ministry of Aircraft Production as the naval representative; he retired in 1943. He was made Knight Commander of the Order of the Bath (KCB) in the 1938 Birthday Honours.

He was promoted admiral on 1 August 1940.

Personal life
In 1917, Laurence married Esmé Coghlan White. They had two sons and a daughter. He died at St. Peter's Hospital in Chertsey, Surrey, aged 87.

References

1882 births
1970 deaths
Royal Navy admirals
Military personnel from Kent
Knights Commander of the Order of the Bath
Companions of the Distinguished Service Order
Recipients of the Order of St. Vladimir, 4th class
Chevaliers of the Légion d'honneur
Royal Navy submarine commanders
Royal Navy officers of World War I